Ziomek is a Polish-language surname. Notable people with the surname include:

Becky Wilczak (born 1980)  American luger
 (born 1961), Polish journalist and writer
 (born 1965), Polish actor

See also

Polish-language surnames